Rahab (Arabic: راحاب, a vast space of a land) was, according to the Book of Joshua, a Gentile woman who lived in Jericho in the Promised Land and assisted the Israelites in capturing the city by hiding two men who had been sent to scout the city prior to their attack. In the New Testament, she is lauded both as an example of a saint who lived by faith, and as someone "considered righteous" for her works.

The King James Version renders the name as Rachab, after its literal spelling in Greek, which differs from the spelling for Rahab in James and Hebrews. Most modern versions render it as Rahab ignoring the distinction.

Rahab's profession

The Hebrew אשה זונה (ishah zonah), used to describe Rahab in Joshua 2:1, literally means "a prostitute woman". In rabbinic texts, however, she is explained as being an "innkeeper," based on the Aramaic Targum: פונדקאית. Rahab's name is presumably the shortened form of a sentence name rāḥāb-N, "the god N has opened/widened (the womb?)". The Hebrew zōnâ may refer to secular or cultic prostitution, and the latter is widely believed to have been an invariable element of Canaanite religious practice, although recent scholarship has disputed this. However, there was a separate word, qědēšâ, that could be used to designate prostitutes of the cultic variety.

Josephus mentions that Rahab kept an inn but is silent as to whether merely renting out rooms was her only source of income. It was not uncommon for both an inn and a brothel to operate within the same building; thus entering Rahab's quarters was not necessarily a deviation from Joshua's orders. Indeed, as Robert Boling notes, such an establishment might have represented an ideal location for spies to gather intelligence. A number of scholars have noted that the narrator in Joshua 2 may have intended to remind the readers of the "immemorial symbiosis between military service and bawdy house".

In the Christian New Testament, the Epistle of James and the Epistle to the Hebrews follow the tradition set by the translators of the Septuagint in using the Greek word "πόρνη" (pórnē, which is usually translated to English as "harlot" or "prostitute") to describe Rahab.

William L. Lyons observed that biblical interpreters have viewed Rahab as a model of hospitality, mercy, faith, patience, and repentance in her interaction with Joshua's spies. Thus the harlot of Jericho became a paragon of virtue.

In the Hebrew Bible 

According to the book of Joshua, when the Hebrews were encamped at Shittim, in the "Arabah" or Jordan valley opposite Jericho, ready to cross the river, Joshua, as a final preparation, sent out two spies to investigate the military strength of Jericho. The spies stayed in Rahab's house, which was built into the city wall. The soldiers sent to capture the spies asked Rahab to bring out the spies. Instead, she hid them under bundles of flax on the roof. It was the time of the barley harvest, and flax and barley are ripe at the same time in the Jordan valley, so that "the bundles of flax stalks might have been expected to be drying just then".

Rahab told the spies: 

After escaping, the spies promised to spare Rahab and her family after taking the city, even if there should be a massacre, if she would mark her house by hanging a red cord out the window. Some have claimed that the symbol of the red cord is related to the practice of the "red-light district".

When the city of Jericho fell, Rahab and her whole family were preserved according to the promise of the spies, and were incorporated among the Jewish people. (In siege warfare of antiquity, a city that fell after a prolonged siege was commonly subjected to a massacre and sack.)

Tikva Frymer-Kensky regards Rahab as "smart, proactive, tricky and unafraid to disobey and deceive her king". She also credits Rahab with being "one of Israel’s early saviors" due to "her allegiance to God and Israel". As the first non-Israelite person, and in particular the first Canaanite woman, to ally with Israel, Rahab's convictions led her to protect the men sent by Joshua despite her background.

Michael Coogan says the book of Joshua, more than any other book of the Bible, contains short etiological narratives that explain the origins of religious rituals, topographical features, genealogical relationships, and other aspects of ancient Israelite life, and that the legend of Rahab is such an example. The story of Rahab would therefore provide an answer as to how a Canaanite group became part of Israel in spite of the Deuteronomistic injunction to kill all Canaanites and not to intermarry with them.

In rabbinic literature 
In the midrash, Rahab is named as one of the four most beautiful women the world has ever known, along with Sarah, Abigail, and Esther. In the Babylonian Talmud, Rahab was so beautiful that the very mention of her name could cause arousal (Megillah 15a). Rahab is said to have converted at the age of 50, after practising prostitution for 40 years, and repented according to three sins, saying:

A similar tradition has Rahab declaring, "Pardon me by merit of the rope, the window, and the flaxen [the stalks of flax under which she concealed the spies]."

The rabbis viewed Rahab as a worthy convert to Judaism, and attested that Rahab married Joshua following her conversion; their descendants included the prophets Jeremiah, Hilkiah, Seraiah, Mahseiah, Baruch, Ezekiel and the prophetess Hulda, although there is no report in the book of Joshua of the leader marrying anyone, or having any family life. Rahab often is mentioned alongside Jethro (Yitro) and Na'aman as "positive examples" of the converts who joined Israel, and another midrash has Rahab acting as an advocate for all nations of the world.

In the New Testament
In the New Testament, Rahab (Greek Ῥαάβ) of the Book of Joshua is mentioned as an example of a person of faith and of good works. Rahab is referred to as "the harlot" in each of these passages.

A different spelling of the name, Rachab (as transliterated in the King James translation of the Greek Ῥαχάβ) is mentioned in the Gospel of Matthew as one of the ancestors of Jesus (Matthew 1:5). She married Salmon of the Tribe of Judah and was the mother of Boaz. Most other English Bibles transcribe her name as Rahab.

In fiction
 Rahab is depicted as a virtuous soul (in The Third Circle of Heaven) in Dante's Divine Comedy (Paradiso 9.112 ff.)
Rahab is a figure in the mythos of William Blake. She is pictured as a harlot, akin to the whore of Babylon, and figures alongside Blake's character of Tirzah, as representing materialism, false religion, and fallen sexuality. Rahab's embrace of Urizen, who loosely represents fallen reason, is seen as the consolidation of error necessary to bring about the Final Judgment.
 The claim of Hugh Broughton, a controversial historian, that Rahab was already "a harlot at ten years of age" is used by Humbert Humbert to explain or perhaps justify his attraction to young girls in Nabokov's Lolita.
Fictional accounts of Rahab's life
 Afshar, Tessa. Pearl in the Sand (2010), 
 Burton, Anne.  Rahab's Story (2005), ; Book 2 in Burton's "Women of the Bible" series.
 Havel, Carlene and Faucheux, Sharon. The Scarlet Cord (2014), 
 MacFarlane, Hannah. The Scarlet Cord (2009), 
 Morris, Gilbert. Daughter of Deliverance. ; Book 6 of "Lions of Judah" Series.
 Rivers, Francine. Unashamed: Rahab (2000), ; Book 2 in Rivers' "A Lineage of Grace" series.
 Slaughter, Frank G. The Scarlet Cord: A Novel of the Woman of Jericho (1956), 
 Smith, Jill Eileen. The Crimson Cord: Rahab's Story (2015). ; Book 1 in Smith's "Daughters of the Promised Land" series.
 Wolf, Joan. This Scarlet Cord: The Love Story of Rahab (2012), 
 Jennings, Jenifer. "Crimson Cord" (2017),
 Craig, Naomi. "Rahab's Courage" (2021),
Television portrayals
Rahab is portrayed by Myrna Fahey in the 1967 TV series The Time Tunnel in episode 20 entitled "The Walls of Jericho".
Rahab is portrayed by Stephanie Leonidas in the 2013 TV miniseries The Bible

See also

 Hooker with a heart of gold
 Rahab (term)

References

External links
Photos of Rihab at the American Center of Research

Converts to Judaism from paganism
Female prostitutes
Biblical Jericho
Women in the Hebrew Bible
Hebrew Bible people
Biblical women in ancient warfare
Book of Joshua
Christian female saints from the Old Testament
People in the catholic epistles
People from Jericho
Tribe of Judah